This is a list of people who were born in, residents of, or otherwise closely associated with the city of Boston, Massachusetts and its surrounding metropolitan statistical area.

0-9
 7L & Esoteric – rap group

A

 Abiel Abbot (1770–1828), born in Andover, clergyman and author
 Ezra Abbot (1819–1884), biblical scholar, taught at Harvard Divinity School
 Joel Abbot (1776–1826), naval officer
 Amos Abbott (1786–1868), born in Westford, member of the United States House of Representatives from Massachusetts
 Austin Abbott (1831–1896), born in Boston,  lawyer, novelist, and academic
 Benjamin Vaughan Abbott (1830–1890), born in Boston, lawyer and legal writer
 Joseph Carter Abbott (1825–1882), publisher of the Boston Bee
 Josiah Gardner Abbott (1814–1891), member of United States House of Representatives
Abdul-Malik Abu (born 1995), basketball player in the Israeli Premier Basketball League
 Edith Achilles (1892 – 1989), psychologist
 Abigail Adams (1744–1818), born in Weymouth, First Lady of the United States
 Abijah Adams (1754–1816), born in Boston, journalist, often embroiled in lawsuits against him
 Charles Francis Adams, Sr. (1807–1886), born in Boston; son of Abigail Adams and John Adams; Congressman; diplomat; writer
 Edwin Adams (1834–1877), born in Medford, 19th-century stage actor
 Eliphalet Adams (1677–1753), born in Medford, clergyman and missionary
 Hannah Adams (1755–1831), born in Medfield, famous Christian writer
 Henry Adams (1838–1918), born in Boston, journalist, historian, academic and novelist
 Jasper Adams (1793–1841), born in Medway, clergyman and college president
 Nehemiah Adams (1806–1878), clergyman and author
 Sammy Adams, musician
 Samuel Adams, American Revolution patriot, signer of the Declaration of Independence
 Aerosmith, band
 Ben Affleck, Academy Award-winning actor, screenwriter and director, brother of Casey
 Casey Affleck, Academy Award-winning actor, brother of Ben
 George Aiken (1830–1876), born in Boston, actor and playwright
 Amos T. Akerman (1821–1880), United States Attorney General, born in Portsmouth, New Hampshire
 Akrobatik, hip hop artist, member of The Perceptionists
 Al B. Sure, singer
 Mildred Albert (1905–1991), American fashion show producer and radio and television personality
 Louisa May Alcott, 19th-century author of Little Women
 Horatio Alger Jr., author
 Fred Allen, radio comedian
 Frederick Lewis Allen, writer
 Joseph Allen (1749–1827), born in Boston, United States Congressman
 Nathaniel M. Allen, soldier in Civil War, awarded Congressional Medal of Honor
 The Almighty RSO, rap group
 John Amaechi, NBA player
 American Hi-Fi, band
 American Nightmare (band) - hardcore band
 Amerie, R&B artist
 Ed Ames, actor and singer
 Tony Amonte, NHL player
 Anarchy Club, band
 Leroy Anderson, composer for Boston Pops Orchestra
 Mary Antin, author
 Apollo Sunshine, band
 Thomas Gold Appleton (1812–1884), writer
 Isabel Atkin, British–American skier and Olympic medalist for Great Britain. 
 Crispus Attucks, American Revolution patriot
 Red Auerbach, Boston Celtics coach and president, Basketball Hall of Famer
 John Augustus (1785–1859), born in Boston, philanthropist and pioneer of probation
 James Trecothick Austin (1784–1870), born in Boston, member of Massachusetts General Court and Massachusetts Attorney General
 Jonathan Loring Austin (1748–1826), born in Boston; officer in American Revolutionary War; Massachusetts state representative, senator, secretary, and treasurer

B

 Bad Rabbits – band
 Arthur Baker – rap DJ, music producer
 Bang Camaro – rock band
 Sasha Banks – WWE wrestler, former WWE Raw Women's Champion, former NXT Women's Champion
 Maria Barrett, US Army Major General; older sister of US Army General Paula Lodi   
 Dana Barros – former NBA player
 Erinn Bartlett – actress
 Zered Bassett – professional skateboarder
 Benjamin E. Bates – founder and namesake of Bates College
 Ruth Batson – civil rights and education activist
 Susan Batson – actress, author, and producer; daughter of Ruth Batson
 Peter D. Bear – Wisconsin State Senator
 Bell Biv DeVoe – music group
 Gaston Bell – stage and silent film actor
 Tobin Bell – actor (born in Queens, NY, raised in Weymouth)
 Mark Bellhorn – MLB player
 Asher Benjamin – architect and author
 Frank Weston Benson – Impressionist artist
 Rick Berlin – musician
 Leonard Bernstein – New York Philharmonic conductor, composer and pianist
 Big D and the Kids Table – band
 Big Shug – rapper
 Traci Bingham – actress, model
 Mike Birbiglia – comedian
 Connie Britton – actress
 Molly Birnbaum – writer
 William Blackstone (also spelled Blaxton) – first European settler
 Arthur Blake – athlete
 Will Blalock – former NBA player for 
 David Blatt (born 1959) – Israeli-American basketball player and coach (most recently, for the Cleveland Cavaliers)
 C. L. Blood – physician
 Matt Bloom – NFL player and professional wrestler, known for his time in WWE
 Michael Bloomberg – former Mayor of New York City
 Bob and Ray – comedy team
 Ernie Boch Jr. – president of Boch Enterprises
 Ray Bolger – actor and dancer, Scarecrow in The Wizard of Oz
 Veda Ann Borg – film actress
 Boston – band
 Boys Like Girls – band
 Ron Brace – NFL player, New England Patriots
 Nathaniel Jeremiah Bradlee – architect
 William J. Bratton – chief of police for NYPD and LAPD
 John Britton – abortion provider
 Edward W. Brooke – first African American elected by popular vote to United States Senate
 Bobby Brown – singer
 Carolyn Brown – dancer, writer, choreographer
 Earle Brown – composer
 Sam Brown – comedian from IFC sketch comedy show Whitest Kids U' Know
 Scott Brown – U.S. Senator
 William B. Broydrick – Wisconsin State Assemblyman
Aimee Buchanan (born 1993) – American-born Olympic figure skater for Israel
 Charles Bulfinch – architect who designed Massachusetts State House, original United States Capitol dome and rotunda
 James "Whitey" Bulger – organized crime boss
 Ephraim Wales Bull – creator of the concord grape 
 Thomas Burke – sprinter
 Bill Burr – comedian
 Edwin C. Burt – shoemaker
 Bury Your Dead – band
 George H. W. Bush – 41st President of The United States
 Vannevar Bush – scientist

C

 C60 – band
 Will Calhoun – drummer for Living Colour (born in NY, lived in Boston)
 Steve Carell – actor and comedian, The Office, The Daily Show, The 40-Year-Old Virgin, Despicable Me
 The Cars – band
 Melnea Cass – community and civil rights activist
 Peggy Cass – actress and TV game show panelist
 John Cazale – actor, The Godfather, The Deer Hunter, Dog Day Afternoon
 John Cena – professional wrestler, known for his time in WWE
 Nicholas Raymond Cerio – founder of Nick Cerio's Kenpo
 Kevin Chapman – actor
 Julius Caesar Chappelle – Massachusetts legislator
 Ken Cheeseman – actor
 Gary Cherone – singer (Extreme and Van Halen)
 Michael Chiklis – actor, The Shield
 Neil Cicierega – Internet personality, created Potter Puppet Pals
 Louis C.K. – comedian and actor
 Lenny Clarke – comedian and actor
 The Click Five – band
 Alex Cobb – baseball pitcher
 John A. Collins – Chief of Chaplains of the U.S. Air Force
 Misha Collins – actor
 Jerry Colonna – entertainer
 Greg Comella – NFL fullback
 Dane Cook – comedian and actor
 Calvin Coolidge – 30th President of the United States
 Harriet Abbott Lincoln Coolidge – author, philanthropist, reformer
 Jennifer Coolidge – actress, American Pie, A Mighty Wind, Legally Blonde
 John Singleton Copley – artist
 Chick Corea – Grammy Award-winning jazz musician and composer
 Jeff Corwin – TV personality
 Aisha Cousins (born 1978) - artist/performance art score writer
 Lynne Cox – professional swimmer
 Charlie Coyle (born 1992) – hockey player
 Zach Cregger – actor, comedian, star of the IFC sketch comedy series WKUK
 Norm Crosby – comedian
 Marcia Cross – actress, Desperate Housewives
 James Michael Curley – Mayor of Boston, Massachusetts Governor, and U.S. Representative
 Jane Curtin – actress and comedian
 Johnny Curtis – professional wrestler, known for his time in WWE
 Thomas Curtis (1873–1944) – athlete
 Richard Cushing – Archbishop of Boston and Cardinal of the Roman Catholic Church
 Jay Cutler – 4x IFBB Mr. Olympia, bodybuilder 
 Susan Webb Cushman (1822–1859) – stage actress

D

 Joey Daccord – ice hockey goaltender
 Dick Dale – musician
 Matt Damon – actor and Oscar-winning screenwriter, Good Will Hunting, The Departed, Ocean's Eleven and Bourne Identity series
 Evan Dando – musician
 Duncan Daniels, Nigerian-American afropop and afrobeat musician, producer and songwriter
 Bette Davis – Academy Award-winning actress, Dark Victory, Jezebel, All About Eve
 Daniel Davis Jr. - nineteenth century inventot
 Geena Davis – Academy Award-winning actress, The Accidental Tourist
 Henry Dearborn – physician, general, and politician
 Henry Alexander Scammell Dearborn – lawyer, author, statesman, soldier, Mayor of Roxbury; son of Henry Dearborn
 Death Before Dishonor – band
 Patrick DeCoste – musician
 Manny Delcarmen – MLB pitcher
 Becky DelosSantos – Playboy Playmate centerfold, April 1994
 Brad Delp – singer
 Paul Demayo – IFBB professional bodybuilder
 Tony DeMarco – boxer, welterweight champion, born 1932 in North End
 Joseph Dennie – writer
 Joe Derrane (1930-2016) – accordion player
 Michael Dertouzos (1936–2001) – computer scientist
 Albert DeSalvo – serial killer known as "The Boston Strangler"
 Jack DeSena – actor, played Sokka in Avatar: The Last Airbender
 P. T. Deutermann – author
 Diamante – rock singer
 Dinosaur Jr. – band
 Rick DiPietro – NHL goaltender (from Boston suburbs)
 Ken Doane – professional wrestler, known for his time in WWE
 Dresden Dolls – punk cabaret duo
 Dropkick Murphys – band
 Drop Nineteens - band
 Shem Drowne – America's first weathervane maker
 Robert Drinan – former U.S. Congressman
 W. E. B. Du Bois – scholar, professor; first African American to receive a Ph.D. from Harvard; founder of NAACP
 Joseph Dudley – Colonial Governor of Massachusetts
 Michael Dukakis – Massachusetts governor, US presidential candidate in 1988
 William C. Durant – founder of General Motors
 Adam Duritz – singer-songwriter for Counting Crows (born in Baltimore, lived in Boston)
 Eliza Dushku – actress
 Mary Dyer – martyr

E
 Ed O.G. – hip hop artist
 Adam Edelman (born 1991) – American-born four-time Israeli National Champion in skeleton event, and Israeli Olympian
 Charles H. Eglee – television screenwriter
 Richard J. Egan – founder and chairman of EMC Corporation
 Charles C. Eldredge – art historian and educator
 Ralph Waldo Emerson – essayist, lecturer, poet
 Ernie and the Automatics – band
 Mike Eruzione – captain of USA's 1980 Winter Olympics hockey team (from Boston suburbs)
 Julius Erving – Basketball Hall of Famer, UMass, New York Nets, Philadelphia 76ers
 William Eustis – early American statesman, Governor of Massachusetts
 Chris Evans – actor, known for role as "Captain America"
 Patrick Ewing – Basketball Hall of Famer, NCAA champion, center for New York Knicks
 Patrick Ewing Jr. – NBA player, New York Knicks, New Orleans Hornets
 Extreme – band

F

 Louis Farrakhan – head of Nation of Islam
 Charles Farrell – actor
 Spike Feresten – screenwriter and television personality
 John Ferruggio – led evacuation of Pan Am Flight 93, hijacked in 1970
 Arthur Fiedler – Boston Pops orchestra conductor
 Charles L. Fletcher – architect and interior designer; owner of Charles Fletcher Design
 Doug Flutie – Heisman Trophy-winning quarterback, Boston College; AFL, CFL, and NFL player, television commentator
 Robert Bennet Forbes – sea captain, China trader
 Ben Foster – actor (born in Boston)
 Dwight Foster – Massachusetts Attorney General; associate justice of the Massachusetts Supreme Judicial Court
 Jon Foster – actor (born in Boston)
 Arlene Francis – actress, radio and TV personality (What's My Line?)
 Black Francis – of the band Pixies
 Benjamin Franklin – author, public servant, diplomat, signer of the Declaration of Independence
 Bettina Freeman – opera singer
 Robert Frost – iconic poet

G

 Ari Graynor – actress
 The G-Clefs – Top 40 soul group
 Tony Gaffney (born 1984) – basketball player in the Israeli Basketball Premier League
 Greg Gagne – MLB player
 Ryan Gallant – professional skateboarder (Plan B Skateboards, DC Shoes)
 Gang Green – band 
 Gang Starr – rap group
 Erle Stanley Gardner – lawyer, author, creator of Perry Mason
 Edmund H. Garrett – prolific 19th- and 20th-century book illustrator and artist
 Althea Garrison – politician and first known transgender member of a state legislature in the United States
 Peter Gerety – actor
 Elbridge Gerry – signer of Declaration of Independence; Governor of Massachusetts; Vice President of the United States; gave his name to "gerrymandering"
 Kahlil George Gibran – sculptor 
Kevin Garnett – retired professional basketball player
 Charles Dana Gibson – illustrator
 Joy Giovanni – professional wrestler, known for her time in WWE
 Paul Michael Glaser – actor and director, Starsky & Hutch
 Tom Glavine – Hall of Fame baseball pitcher for Atlanta Braves
 Sumner Jules Glimcher – professor, author and filmmaker
 Godsmack – band
 Jared Goldberg – Olympic skier
 Duff Goldman – star of Food Network TV show Ace of Cakes (born in Detroit, lived in MA)
 Ezekiel Goldthwait (1710-1782) – prominent in town affairs in the years leading up to the American Revolution
 Benjamin Gould – astronomer
 Robert Goulet – Grammy Award-winning singer and Tony-winning actor (born in Lawrence)
 Paul Graham – hacker, painter, essayist, tech startup guru
 Kaz Grala – NASCAR Camping World Truck Series driver, youngest ever to win a NASCAR Touring Series race
 Geoffrey Gray (born 1997) - American-Israeli professional basketball player in the Israeli Basketball Premier League
 Clark Gregg – actor
 Justine Greiner – Playboy Playmate centerfold, February 1984
 Mike Grier – NHL player
 Tammy Grimes – actress, singer
 Hattie Tyng Griswold (1842–1909) – author, poet
 Matt Grzelcyk - NHL player
 Bill Guerin – NHL player
 Louise Gunning – musical actress
 Guru – rapper, member of Gang Starr
 Guster – band
 Jasmine Guy – actress and singer

H

 Betsy Hager – farmer and blacksmith, produced weapons for the American Revolution
 Edward Everett Hale – author
 Jack Haley – actor, known as Tin Man in The Wizard of Oz
 Anthony Michael Hall – actor, The Breakfast Club, The Dead Zone
 Marc-André Hamelin – pianist, composer
 John Hancock – statesman, signer of Declaration of Independence
 Noah Hanifin – ice hockey player for the Calgary Flames drafted by the Carolina Hurricanes in 2015
 Kay Hanley – musician
 G Hannelius – actress
 Bob Hansen – MLB player
 Hannah Hanson Kinney – alleged serial killer
 Beth Harrington – filmmaker and musician
 Maggie Hassan – United States Senator and former governor of New Hampshire
 Matt Hasselbeck – NFL quarterback for the Tennessee Titans
 Tim Hasselbeck – NFL quarterback for the Arizona Cardinals
 Juliana Hatfield – musician
 Kevin Hayes - NHL player
 Roy Haynes – jazz musician
 Heads of State – music group
 Ed Healey – NFL Hall of Fame player for Chicago Bears
 Have Heart – hardcore band
 Armand Van Helden – DJ
 Ed Herlihy – radio and television announcer
 Rich Hill – MLB pitcher
 John Michael Higgins – game show TV host/cartoon narrator
 Karl Hobbs – George Washington University basketball coach
 Oliver Wendell Holmes – physician and author
 Oliver Wendell Holmes Jr. - U. S. Supreme Court Justice
 Winslow Homer – artist
 Michelle Hoover – author
 The Hope Conspiracy - hardcore band
 Allen Hoskins – actor
 Joan Imogen Howard – educator
 Christine Hunschofsky – politician

I
 Dorothy Iannone (1933-2022), visual artist
 Ice Nine Kills - music group 
 Isis – music group

J
 Julia Jones – actress
 Shar Jackson – actress
 Jada –  pop and R&B singing group signed to UniversalMotown
 Marie Jansen – musical actress
 Martin Johnson – lead singer of Boys Like Girls
 Thomas Johnston – engraver, organ builder, japanner, and heraldic painter.
 JoJo – singer, actress
Jerma – Twitch streamer, YouTuber
 Sam Jones III – actor, Glory Road
 Darin Jordan – NFL player
 Rebecca Richardson Joslin – author, lecturer, benefactor, clubwoman
 Jujubee – drag queen
 Tom Jung – art director, graphic designer, illustrator, storyboard artist

K

 Madeline Kahn – actress, Blazing Saddles
 Mindy Kaling – actress, The Office
 Alex Karalexis – UFC, WEC fighter
 Karmin – musical group
 Robert Kelly – actor, comedian
 John F. Kennedy – Massachusetts Senator and 35th President of the United States
 Joseph P. Kennedy, Sr. – ambassador, father of John F. Kennedy, Robert Kennedy, and Edward Kennedy
 Myles Kennedy – singer, songwriter
 Robert F. "Bobby" Kennedy – U.S. Attorney General and New York Senator
 Edward "Ted" Kennedy (1932–2009) – longtime Massachusetts Senator 
 Jack Kerouac – beat poet and writer
 Nancy Kerrigan – Olympic figure skating silver medalist
 John Kerry – U.S. Secretary of State, longtime Massachusetts Senator (1985–2013) and Presidential candidate in 2004
 Keytar Bear – keytarist in a bear costume who commonly performs at MBTA stations
 Killswitch Engage – metalcore band
 John King – CNN chief political correspondent
 Kofi Kingston – professional wrestler, known for his time in WWE (born in Ghana, lived in Boston)
 Jonathan Knight – singer, dancer (New Kids on the Block)
 Jordan Knight – singer, dancer (New Kids on the Block)
 Henry Knox - First U.S. Secretary of War, Founding Father, Senior General in the Continental Army under Washington
 Yitzhak Aharon Korff – Grand Rabbi, diplomat, international consultant
 Lauren Koslow – soap opera actress
 Walter "Killer" Kowalski – professional wrestler, teacher, photographer
 Bob Kraft – owner of the New England Patriots
 John Krasinski – actor (Jim Halpert in NBC's The Office)
 Sol Kumin – businessman, philanthropist and racehorse owner

L

 Eugenio Lopez III – chairman emeritus of ABS-CBN
 Phil Labonte – musician
 PJ Ladd – professional skateboarder
 Liz LaManche – public artist
 Jack Landron – folk singer, songwriter
 Robert Lanza – medical doctor and scientist
 Lewis Howard Latimer – inventor
 Denis Leary – actor, comedian, writer and director
 Matt LeBlanc – actor, Friends
 Dennis Lehane – author
 Jack Lemmon – Academy Award-winning actor, Mister Roberts, Save the Tiger, The Odd Couple, Grumpy Old Men
 Jay Leno – comedian and television personality
 Letters To Cleo – rock band
 Elma Lewis – founder of National Center of Afro-American Artists (including a museum) and Elma Lewis School of Fine Arts
 Gary Russell Libby – art historian, museum director, curator
 William Linn – defender of the Alamo
 Henry Cabot Lodge – politician
 Paula Lodi – US Army Brigadier General; younger sister of US Army General Maria Barrett 
 Edward Lawrence Logan – military officer, jurist, politician
 Howie Long – NFL player
 Amy Lawrence Lowell – Pulitzer Prize-winning poet
 Robert Lowell – poet
 Joyner Lucas – rapper
 Adam Lundquist – radio DJ
 Lyte Funky Ones – pop trio

M

 Aimee Mann – singer
 Jonathan Mann – HIV/AIDS researcher and World Health Organization administrator; killed on Swissair Flight 111
 Rob Mariano – Survivor contestant
 Marky Mark and the Funky Bunch – rap group
 Mike Matarazzo – Professional Bodybuilder
 Maria Menounos – actress, journalist, professional wrestler
 Connie Martinson – talk show host
 Aaron Maund – Major League soccer player
 Masspike Miles – singer, songwriter, producer, Perfect Gentlemen (Maybach Music Group)
 Cotton Mather – Puritan minister and author
 Jonah Matranga – singer/songwriter
 Greg Mauldin – NHL player, Ottawa Senators
 John Mayer – singer-songwriter (born in Connecticut, lived in Boston)
 Charles Johnson Maynard – naturalist and ornithologist
 Chris McCarron – jockey
Pedro Martínez – retired professional baseball player, member of National Baseball Hall of Fame.
 Tommy McCarthy – baseball player
 John P. McDonough – Chief of Chaplains of U.S. Air Force
 Neal McDonough – actor
 Sean McDonough – sports announcer
 Will McDonough – sportswriter
 Richard McGonagle – voice actor
 Joey McIntyre – singer, dancer, actor (New Kids on the Block)
 Amy Upham Thomson McKean – pianist, songwriter and composer
 Ed McMahon – television personality
 Peter McNeeley – boxer (born in Medfield)
 Michael McShane – actor
 Nelson Merced – activist and politician, first Hispanic elected to Massachusetts General Court
 David Merkow – golfer
 The Mighty Mighty Bosstones – band
 Roger Miller – musician
 Wayne Millner – NFL Hall of Famer
 Mission of Burma – band
 Mr. Lif – hip-hop artist, member of The Perceptionists
 Joe Moakley – congressman
 Leo Monahan (journalist) (1926–2013) – American sports journalist
 William Monahan – screenwriter
 Morphine – band
 Van Morrison – singer, musician, Rock and Roll Hall of Fame inductee in 1993 (born in Belfast, Northern Ireland, has lived in Boston for years)
 Robert Morse – actor
 Samuel F. B. Morse – inventor and painter, inventor of electric telegraph and Morse code
 Eddie Mottau – guitarist
 Helen Messinger Murdoch (1862–1956) – photographer; pioneered use of autochromes in travel photography
 Connor Murphy - professional ice hockey player

N

 Jack Nance – actor, title character in Eraserhead
 Jason Nash – actor
 Packy Naughton – Major League Baseball pitcher
 William Cooper Nell – abolitionist
 Betty Jo Nelsen – member of Wisconsin State Assembly
 Victor Folke Nelson – Author, prison reform advocate, and sensational prison escapist
 New Edition – music group
 New Kids on the Block – band
 Nicky Jam – reggaeton singer and songwriter, Latin Grammy winner
 Terry Nihen – Playboy Playmate
 Leonard Nimoy – actor, known as Mr. Spock from Star Trek
 Zack Norman – actor, producer, financier
 Edward Norton – actor, American History X, Fight Club, The Italian Job
 B. J. Novak – actor, writer for NBC's The Office (from Newton)
 Christopher Nowinski – professional wrestler, known for his time in WWE

O
 Bill O'Brien – former head coach of Penn State football and the NFL's Houston Texans
 Conan O'Brien – television personality
 On Broken Wings – band
 Patrice O'Neal – actor, comedian
 Thomas "Tip" O'Neill – U.S. Congressman, Speaker of the House 
David Ortiz – retired professional baseball player
 James Otis Jr. – patriot
 Mike O'Malley – actor

P

 Robert Treat Paine – signer of Declaration of Independence
 Amanda Palmer – songwriter and performer 
 John Peck – naval architect and merchant 
 Evelyn Parnell – opera singer
 George Patton IV – U.S. Army general; son of famed World War II General George S. Patton III
 Susan Paul – abolitionist
 The Perceptionists – rap group
 Esther Petrack – contestant on America's Next Top Model, Cycle 15
 Paul Pierce – professional basketball player.
John Pigeon – Massachusetts Commissary General during Revolutionary War
 Albert Pike – C.S. Army general; author, poet, orator, jurist and prominent member of the Freemasons
 John Pinette – actor and comedian
 The Pixies – band
 Sylvia Plath – poet and author
 Edgar Allan Poe – poet and writer
 Amy Poehler – actress and comedian 
 John Pollini – art historian
 Ellen Pompeo – actress
 Tom Poti – NHL player, Washington Capitals
 Powerman 5000 – metal band
 Seth Putnam – musician
 Moriah Rose Pereira (Poppy) – musician and YouTube personality

Q
 Dionne Quan – voice actress
 John Quinlan – pro wrestler

R

 Nicole Raczynski – pro wrestler known as Nikki Roxx, and as Roxxi in TNA Wrestling
 Aly Raisman – gymnast and Olympic gold medalist 
 Sumner Redstone – chairman of the board and chief executive officer of Viacom
Arthur E. Reimer – two-time presidential candidate of Socialist Labor Party of America
 James Remar – actor, known for roles of Ajax in The Warriors and of Harry Morgan in "Dexter"
 Lee Remick – actress, Days of Wine and Roses, Anatomy of a Murder
 Jerry Remy – MLB player and sportscaster
 Patrick Renna – actor, known for role of Ham in The Sandlot
 Frank Renzulli – writer, actor
 Paul Revere – silversmith and American Revolution patriot
 Maia Reficco – actress and singer
Abbie Richards – TikToker
 Ellen Swallow Richards – "mother" of home economics and sewage treatment
 Jonathan Richman – musician
 Sam Rivers – jazz musician
 Alex Rocco – actor, known for role of Moe Greene in The Godfather
 Norman Rockwell – artist
 Jeremy Roenick – NHL player
 Jereme Rogers – professional skateboarder
 Mitt Romney – 70th Governor of Massachusetts; 2012 U.S. presidential candidate
 Francis Rosa – sports journalist for The Boston Globe
 Eli Roth – director, writer, producer, actor
 Lillian Roth – actress, singer
 John Rowe (1715–1787) – Boston resident merchant and diarist, original developer of Rowes Wharf
 Nathaniel Ruggles – U.S. Representative
 Bill Russell – professional basketball player and coach, NBA champion and Olympic gold medalist
 Blanchard Ryan – actress

S
 Timothy Shriver  – Chairman of Special Olympic Committee
 Alicia Sacramone – gymnast, world champion and Olympic silver medalist
 Perry Saturn – pro wrestler
 Edward Seaga – former Jamaican politician and statesman. His parents returned to Jamaica with Edward when the boy was three months old.
 Richard Scarry – author, illustrator
 Jeremy Scott – televangelist, nudist, poet
 Ebenezer Seaver – U.S. Representative, chairman of Roxbury Board of Selectmen
 Anne Sexton – poet
 Dan Shaughnessy – Boston Globe sports columnist
 William E. Sheridan – actor
 Anthony T. Shtogren – U.S. Air Force general
 Fatima Siad – fashion model, third place on America's Next Top Model, Cycle 10
 Bill Simmons – sports columnist, "The Sports Guy" on ESPN.com
 Slaine – hip hop artist
 Slapshot – band
 Jenny Slate – actress, comedian, Saturday Night Live cast member
 Samuel Francis Smith – composer
 Jean Kennedy Smith (1928–2020) – sister of president John F. Kennedy; former United States Ambassador to Ireland
 Edward Dexter Sohier – lawyer
 Joseph B. Soloveitchik – rabbi
 Thankful Southwick (1792–1867) – abolitionist, women's rights activist
 James Spader – actor, Boston Legal, The Blacklist
 Clinton Sparks – hip hop DJ, producer
 Statik Selektah – record producer and DJ
 Special Teamz – rap group
 Billy Squier – American rock musician
 Lesley Stahl – television journalist, 60 Minutes
 Staind – band
 Larry Stark – theater critic
 Maurice Starr – musician, producer (New Edition and New Kids on the Block)
 Frederick Stevens – U.S. Representative from Minnesota
 Jane Agnes Stewart — author, editor, and contributor to periodicals
 Sonny Stitt – jazz saxophonist
 Street Dogs – band
 John L. Sullivan – first heavyweight champion of gloved boxing
 Louis Sullivan – architect
 John J. Sullivan – diplomat
 Donna Summer – singer
 William H. Sumner – developer of East Boston
 John Sununu – junior U.S. Senator from New Hampshire (born in Boston)
 William H. Swanson – chairman and CEO of Raytheon Company

T
 Edmund C. Tarbell – painter
 Lofa Tatupu – NFL linebacker
 James Taylor – folk singer
 Ruth Carol Taylor – first African-American flight attendant in the United States
 That Handsome Devil – band
 John Thomas – first man to clear  in high jump
 Thomas W. Thompson –  United States Representative and United States Senator
 Henry David Thoreau – iconic poet, novelist
 Uma Thurman – actress, Pulp Fiction, Kill Bill
 Maura Tierney – actress
 'Til Tuesday – band
 Jimmy Tingle – stand-up comedian, actor
 Jane Toppan – serial killer and nurse
 Eve Torres – professional wrestler
 John Tortorella – NHL coach, head coach of the Columbus Blue Jackets
 Touré – writer, TV host
 Eliza Townsend – poet
 Judy Traub - Minnesota state senator 
 Ralph Tresvant – singer
 Kevin Trudeau – author, pocket billiards promoter, salesman
 Jen Trynin – musician
 Jonathan Tucker – actor
 John Tudor – MLB pitcher, St. Louis Cardinals
 Charles Tufts – founder of Tufts University

U
 Unearth – band
 Hezekiah Usher – first bookseller in the 13 colonies

V
 Sarah Van Patten – ballet dancer
 Steven Van Zandt – musician with Bruce Springsteen band and actor, The Sopranos
 Vanna – band
 Jimmy Vesey – ice hockey player
 Brian Viglione – musician

W

 Philip Waggenheim – gangster 
 Ashley Wagner (born 1991) – figure skater
 Donnie Wahlberg – actor, singer, producer (New Kids on the Block)
 Mark Wahlberg – actor, rapper, producer, Boogie Nights, The Perfect Storm, The Departed, The Fighter
 David Walker – abolitionist
 Jimmy Walker – NBA All-Star
 Mike Wallace – television journalist
 Barbara Walters – television journalist
An Wang – computer engineer and inventor, co-founder of Wang Laboratories
 Fiske Warren – paper manufacturer and philanthropist
 Joseph Warren - Founding Father and Son of Liberty who died at the Battle of Bunker Hill
 Gretchen Osgood Warren – poet and muse
 Sam Waterston – actor
 Jack Welch – businessman, CEO of General Electric
 Westbound Train – band
 Phillis Wheatley – poet and former slave
 Colin White – ice hockey player
 Eli Whitney – inventor of the cotton gin
 Jermaine Wiggins – NFL player
 Tony Williams – jazz drummer
 Alan Wilson – singer, guitarist (Canned Heat)
 Robert Scott Wilson – actor, first male model on The Price Is Right
 Clara Winthrop – philanthropist, art collector
 Danny Wood – singer (New Kids on the Block)
 Gene Wood – game show announcer
 George Wood – baseball player
 Brian Woods – documentary filmmaker
 Benjamin Edward Woolf – British-born composer, playwright, journalist for Boston Saturday Evening Gazette and Boston Globe
 Steven Wright – Academy Award-winning comedian, actor and writer
 Marty Walsh – Mayor of Boston

X

 Malcolm X – civil rights activist, Muslim minister (lived in Roxbury)

Y
 Donnie Yen – Hong Kong actor, martial artist

Z
 Katya Zamolodchikova – drag queen, actor
 Rob Zombie – musician, director, producer.

See also

References

Boston
Boston